Mayya Doroshko (born 23 April 1999) is a Russian synchronised swimmer.

She participated at the 2019 World Aquatics Championships, winning a medal.

References

1999 births
Living people
Russian synchronized swimmers
World Aquatics Championships medalists in synchronised swimming
Artistic swimmers at the 2019 World Aquatics Championships